The Postcode Address File (PAF) is a database that contains all known "delivery points" and postcodes in the United Kingdom. The PAF is a collection of over 29 million Royal Mail postal addresses and 1.8 million postcodes. It is available in a variety of formats including FTP download and compact disc, and was previously available as digital audio tape. As owner of the PAF, Royal Mail is required by section 116 of the Postal Services Act 2000 to maintain the data and make it available on reasonable terms. A charge is made for lookup services or wholesale supply of PAF data. Charges are regulated by Ofcom. It includes small user residential, small user organisation and large user organisation details. There have been requests as part of the Open Data campaign for the PAF to be released by the government free of charge.

Usage
The "delivery points" held on the PAF are routing instructions used by Royal Mail staff to sort and deliver mail quickly and accurately. Elements of the address, including the post town and postcode, are occasionally subject to change, reflecting the operational structure of the postal delivery system. Each address is therefore not necessarily a geographically accurate description of where a property is located. Buildings which contain internal flats or businesses but have only one external front door will only have those internal elements recorded in PAF if the Royal Mail have direct access to them using a key or fob.

File structure

Royal Mail's Programmers Guide lists the following address elements of PAF and their respective maximum field lengths:

Some versions of the PAF also contain the  'Delivery Point Suffix (DPS)'  used in CBC (Customer Bar Code). Alternatively the DPS can be found using Royal Mail's  'Postcode Information File (PIF)'.

Licensing

The PAF licence sets out what PAF can be used for. Licensing options include internal and external use and also more advanced options such as bureau services and broker groups.

An example of typical internal use is an employee of a licensed call centre who uses a PAF-based solution to look up and verify customer addresses. The PAF data is only being used within the licensed end-user and is not passed on to any other legal entity.

On the other hand, an example of external use would be a company which provides a PAF-based address look-up on their customer facing website for their own customers to use when they order goods or services.

Royal Mail provide licensing advice on their website.

Public sector licence

Public sector organisations can now apply to use PAF under the public sector licence use terms. The public sector licence will be fully implemented on 1 April 2015.

Royal Mail has worked along with the Department of Business, Innovation & Skills (BIS) & the Scottish government to develop the public sector licence. The public sector licence is being centrally paid for by these organisations so individual public sector organisations will no longer need to return PAF licence fees to Royal Mail.

The eligible public sector organisations will be able to use PAF within their organisation and on their website for non-commercial purposes. In addition, licensed public sector organisations will be able to share data with other licensed organisations and work collaboratively on data-led projects. The following types of organisations will be eligible:

 Central government
 Local government and emergency services
 Health authorities
 Search and rescue organisations

Any organisation wishing to apply can do so now through Royal Mail's Address Management Unit. The Public Sector Licence will be in place for an initial three years.

Alias data

The "alias file is a supplementary file containing additional data which are not part of official postal addresses, including details that have changed over time, or have been amended by the public and then used. This file is used to identify these elements and cross-reference with the official postal address.

The alias file holds four types of record: locality, thoroughfare, delivery point alias, and county alias:

The locality record – old short forms, local names, and 'postally-not-required' (PNR) details.
The thoroughfare record – contains replacement street and road names for a given locality, thoroughfare or dependent thoroughfare combination.
The delivery point alias record – holds additional information at given addresses, such as trading names and building names.
The county record – holds traditional, administrative and postal county information.

Royal Mail, in their guide to the data products imply that the county alias information was provided when Royal Mail removed the former postal county from the main file.

Errors

Royal Mail acknowledges that the PAF contains errors, and publishes forms for submitting error reports.  A very small number of addresses are not listed correctly, and others (especially new developments) may not be listed at all for a period of time.

Costs and public availability
Between 2004 and 2006 a consultation was taken about the future management of the PAF.  The proposal to release it for use at low or no cost was rejected, and the business model where it was used to raise money from profitable corporations was retained.

The accounts for the PAF for 2005/6 disclosed an income of £18million, 8.6% of which was profit.

Following a government consultation, on 1 April 2010 Ordnance Survey released co-ordinate data for all Great Britain postcodes (but not their address elements) for re-use free of charge under an attribution-only licence, as part of OS OpenData.

See also
National Land and Property Gazetteer
One Scotland Gazetteer

References

External links
PAF from Royal Mail

Postal addresses in the United Kingdom
Postcodes in the United Kingdom
Geographical databases in the United Kingdom